WWE SmackDown! Here Comes the Pain  (known as Exciting Pro Wrestling 5 in Japan) is a professional wrestling video game developed by Yuke's and published by THQ for PlayStation 2 in North America on October 27, 2003. It is the sequel to WWE SmackDown! Shut Your Mouth, the fifth and last game in the WWE SmackDown! series based on World Wrestling Entertainment (WWE), and the final game to be named after the weekly television show of the same name.

Here Comes the Pain received "generally favorable" reviews from critics and "universal acclaim" from users.  The game would be succeeded by WWE SmackDown! vs. Raw in 2004.

Gameplay 
The games introduced a more advanced and extensive grappling system, while still retaining the series' fast gameplay.

Alongside a new grappling system, body damage displays and submission meters (for both the person applying the move and the person breaking out of the move), as well as the ability to break the submission hold when grabbing the ropes, and individual character attributes that consisted of statistics (such as strength, endurance, and speed) were all introduced to the series for the first time. Here Comes the Pain also marks the first time the Elimination Chamber and the Bra and Panties Match would be featured in a wrestling game. 

Alongside a playable roster of over 50 Superstars who were active members of the WWE roster at the time of the game's release, legends were introduced for the first time in the series, which included wrestlers such as Jimmy "Superfly" Snuka and "Rowdy" Roddy Piper, as well as former iterations of current wrestlers, such as The Undertaker with his original "Deadman" gimmick. It also marks the final time that The Rock and Stone Cold Steve Austin would appear in a WWE game as non-legends, and is the first WWE game to feature future mainstays John Cena, Batista, and Rey Mysterio as playable characters. It is also the first game to depict Kane without his mask. 

Additional updates were also made to Season Mode, with decisions (such as where you wanted to go and what you wanted to do next) being made on a new menu screen in your locker room, while players could enter the General Manager's room to ask for title shots and brand switches, as well as having the opportunity to talk to various wrestlers appear backstage. There are multiple titles to go after depending on if you go to SmackDown! or RAW.

Development 
Early beta versions of the game featured Jeff Hardy, Hulk Hogan (along with his alter-ego Mr. America and his 1980s appearance) and The Ultimate Warrior. However, Hogan and Hardy were removed from the game when they  left WWE, and Warrior was ultimately omitted due to legal issues. Data for other omitted wrestlers, including Al Snow, Spike Dudley, Billy Kidman, Billy Gunn, William Regal, Bradshaw, Molly Holly and 3-Minute Warning remains on the final disc, with none of them having any finished character models. The concept of having multiple versions of Hogan in one game was finally realized with his inclusion in the release of WWE SmackDown! vs. Raw 2006.

Reception 

WWE SmackDown! Here Comes the Pain received a "Platinum" sales award from the Entertainment and Leisure Software Publishers Association (ELSPA), indicating sales of at least 300,000 copies in the United Kingdom.

The game received "generally favorable" reviews from critics, according to review aggregator Metacritic.

IGN called the game "one of the best wrestling games we've ever played...With its ultra-improved gameplay mechanics, enhanced visual engine, smarter career mode, and established create-a-character feature, Yuke's and THQ are definitely the track to success." GameSpot said, "What the game lacks in innovation, however, is more than made up for in sheer playability." Eurogamer called it "a superb blend of traditional and wrestling-specific fight mechanics, and there's so much variety here that it wouldn't be an exaggeration to say you could play this one from now until the next SmackDown without getting bored or running out of things to do." GMR said, "Submission moves finally makes [sic] sense, thanks to a logical location-based damage system, and wrestlers' weights are accurately presented."

Other reviews were more mixed. Official U.S. PlayStation Magazine called it "the first game in the series that tries to accommodate both sides by combining quick action with the technical elements of wrestling, and it works -- almost." In Japan, Famitsu gave it a score of 29 out of 40.

Accolades

See also 
Rumble Roses - An all-female wrestling game by Konami that uses the same game engine.

References

External links 

Official Yuke's website (Japanese)

2003 video games
PlayStation 2 games
PlayStation 2-only games
THQ games
Video games developed in Japan
WWE SmackDown video games
WWE video games
Yuke's games
Multiplayer and single-player video games
Professional wrestling games
Video games set in Missouri
Video games set in Tennessee
Video games set in Ohio
Video games set in Detroit
Video games set in New York (state)
video games set in Newcastle upon Tyne
Video games set in Los Angeles
Video games set in Manchester
Video games set in Arkansas
Video games set in New York City
Video games set in Miami
Video games set in Boston
Video games set in Montreal
Video games set in Seattle
Spike Video Game Award winners